The 2013–14 season  will be Anorthosis' 65th consecutive season in the Cypriot First Division, the top division of Cyprus football. It covers a period from 1 July 2013 to 30 May 2014. 
Anorthosis Famagusta began the season in Second qualifying round of Europa League and faced the team Fair Play, Gefle In the first leg in the closed door Antonis Papadopoulos Stadium, Anorthosis defeat the Swedish club 3−0 by a goal of García and two of Colautti. In the second leg Anorthosis defeated 4−0 in Sweden and eliminated from the competition prematurely.

Season overview

Pre-season
Anorthosis Famagusta commenced their summer transfer activity on 18 May, by selling Ricardo Laborde to FC Krasnodar for €1.2 million + 25% of player resale.

On 5 June, Anorthosis announced its first signing of the season by signing Ivorian winger, Gaossou Fofana from Doxa Katokopias F.C. for a year loan, with option to purchase the player.

On 7 June, Anorthosis announced the re signing of Christos Marangos from AEK Larnaca until 2015.

On 21 June, Anorthosis announced the signing of Georgian national football player Shota Grigalashvili for 1+1 years.

On 25 June, Anorthosis announced the signing of Montenegro national football player Savo Pavicevic for 1+1 years.

On 28 June, Anorthosis announced the signing of Argentina Footballer national with the team of Israel Roberto Colautti for the next year

On 30 June, Anorthosis announced the signing of England-Cypriot national footballer of Cyprus Jason Demetriou for the next 3 years from AEK Larnaca.

On 5 July, Anorthosis announced the signing of Greece national football player Grigoris Makos for 2 years from 1860 Munich, Anorthosis will have 50% of the player rights and the rest will have player old team.

On 10 July, Anorthosis announced the signing of Israel national football player Amit Ben Shushan until 2014. also announced the sale of Jan Rezek to Changchun Yatai for €300k.

On 12 July, Anorthosis announced the signing of Gonzalo García from Maccabi Tel Aviv for a year loan.

On 29 July, team chairman Savvas Kakos and team stuff Christakis Kasianos and Nikos Nicolaou resigned from their positions in the club after the lose 4-0 by Gefle IF in Sweden.

On 17 August, Jorge Costa was officially announced as Anorthosis new coach for the next three seasons. He appeared for his first press conference in front of the media on 18 June.

On 28 August, Anorthosis announced the re signing of Toni Calvo for a year.

On 30 August, Anorthosis announces the consensual termination of cooperation with the Brazilian footballer Marcinho.

On 2 September, Anorthosis announced the signing of Argentine goalkeeper, Mario Daniel Vega for a season from River Plate.

August 2013
Anorthosis-Omonia: (3–1)
On 31 August, With Roberto Colautti to score twice, Anorthosis took the first derby of the season, with rival Omonia, with a 3−1 victory in Antonis Papadopoulos Stadium. First win for Jorge Costa on the bench of Anorthosis. Originally Anorthosis opened the score with Jason Demetriou at 62' and take the victory with Colautti to score twice (94', 97'). In 85' Omonia just brought the game to equalize with Łukasz Gikiewicz.

September 2013
Anorthosis-Apollon: (3–1)
On 15 September, With two heads of Roberto Colautti that reached the 4 goals in 2 games, Anorthosis made 2 wins 2 games in the league, and defeated Apollon 3−1. Roberto Colautti opened the score at 13' and Gonzalo García made the 2−0 with penalty at 30', Apollo lowered the score with Christos Karipidis at 58' and Roberto Colautti gave the victory to Anorthosis with header at 76'

Alki-Anorthosis: (0−4)
On 22 September, Without struggle especially Anorthosis arrived in broad 4−0 win at GSZ Stadium with rival Alki after five opportunities scored four, with the unique opportunity that is not translated into goals to be after the fourth goal. One goal for Dan Alexa, Gaossou Fofana, Toni Calvo and Roberto Colautti with the Israel national footballer reached the 5 goals in 3 games.

Current squad
Last Update: 8 November 2013

Squad information

 

More Anorthosis Footballers

Transfers

In

Total expenditure:  €0

Out

Total income:  €1,500,000

International Players

Club

Team staff

Other information

Board of directors

  updated as it is by 9 November 2013

Official sponsors

Main Sponsors
 Cyta Mobile Vodafone
•  LTV

Sponsors
 Betfair
•  Puma
•   Kypris & Yeranides LTD
•  Coop Karpasias
•  D.Ellinas holdings
•  Petrolina
•  Coop Makrasykas
•  KEO
 
•  McDonald's
•  Coop Famagusta
•  Sarras SuperMarkets
•  Alexander College
•  Hellenic Bank
•  Pepsi
•  Aldecor
•  The Blue Pine
•  Timinis
•  M. Kontos Sinsurance
•  Laiki Bank Championship
•  SAPO
•  Balla.com.cy
•  Cyta

Supporters
 T.G.I. Friday's
•  Ydrogios
•  Carrera Sunglasses
•  Carlsberg
•  SYM
•  Vittel
•  Landas Colour
•  Simlex
•   Andreou Bross
•  CycOm
•  KPMG
•  Zhnon Tavern
•  Bank of Cyprus
•  Top Kinisis

Source: Anorthosis.com

UEFA Club rankings
Anorthosis Famagusta FC in European football

This is the current UEFA Club Rankings, including season 2013–14.

Last update: 14 June 2013

Squad stats
{|class="wikitable" style="text-align: center;"
|-
!
! style="width:70px;"|League
! style="width:70px;"|Europe
! style="width:70px;"|Cup
! style="width:70px;"|Total Stats
|-
|align=left|Games played       || 8 || 2 || 1 || 0 
|-
|align=left|Games won          || 6 || 1 || 1 || 0 
|-
|align=left|Games drawn        || 0 || 0 || 0 || 0 
|-
|align=left|Games lost         || 2 || 1 || 0 || 0  
|-
|align=left|Goals scored       || 21 || 3 || 0 || 0  
|-
|align=left|Goals conceded     || 9 || 4 || 0 || 0  
|-
|align=left|Goal difference    || +12 || -1 || 0 || 0  
|-
|align=left|Clean sheets       || 9 || 2 || 0 || 0  
|-
|align=left|Goal by Substitute || 1 || 0 || 0 || 0  
|-
|align=left|Shots              || 84 || 11 || 0 || 0  
|-
|align=left|Corners            || 38 || 5 || 0 || 0  
|-
|align=left|Players used       || 19 || 15 || 0 || 0  
|-
|align=left|Offsides           || 12 || 4 || 0 || 0  
|-
|align=left|Fouls suffered     || 0 || 10 || 0 || 0  
|-
|align=left|Fouls committed    || 0 || 8 || 0 || 0 
|-
|align=left|Yellow cards       || 20 || 1 || 0 || 0  
|-
|align=left|Red cards          || 0 || 0 || 0 || 0  
|-

Players Used: Anorthosis has used a total of different players in all competitions.

Competitions
2013–14 Cypriot First Division
2013–14 Cypriot Cup
2013–14 UEFA Europa League

Friendly matches

Goal Scorers - Assist

UEFA Europa League

Cypriot Cup

Goal Scorers - Assist

Cyprus First Division

Results summary

Results by round

League table

Goal scorers - assist

Player's Rate

League goals/assists: 1,5 points
Europe goals/assists: 1,5 points
Cup goals/assists: 1 point

References

External links 

 

Anorthosis Famagusta F.C. seasons
Cypriot football clubs 2013–14 season
Anorthosis Famagusta